The Compact Computer 40 or CC-40 is a portable computer developed by Texas Instruments.  It started development in 1981, and was released in March 1983 for US$249. The CC-40 has a single-line 31 character LCD display,  weighs 600 grams (22 ounces), and is powered by an AC adapter or can operate for 200 hours on four AA batteries. Memory is not erased by turning the unit off; it can retain data for several months. The CC-40 lacks a way to store data more permanently.  Software was only available on cartridge or by typing programs into its built-in BASIC interpreter. The BASIC interpreter is similar but not identical to that of the TI-99/4A.

The CC-40 uses TI's TMS70C20 CPU, an 8-bit microprocessor that runs at 2.5 MHz. The system has 6 kilobytes of Random Access Memory (expandable to 18 KB),and 34 KB of Read Only Memory. Peripherals can be connected via a Hexbus port: an 80 column printer, printer/plotter, RS-232 interface, and modem. A licensed version of the Exatron Stringy Floppy as a digital "wafertape" unit depicted on the computer's box was only released as a prototype, reportedly because it proved too unreliable.

Development
The Compact Computer 40 was developed under the internal codename "Lonestar".

Reception
BYTE heavily criticized the CC-40, noting that "there's no clock. No file system. Only one BASIC program at a time can reside in memory, and the user can only work with about 5200 bytes of that. And the keyboard is vile". It also noted the lack of any external storage because the TI wafertape drive was not available, and the complete lack of software. The review suggested that the computer should be considered a "dandy scientific calculator" since good programmable calculators cost about the same as the CC-40's  price, but that otherwise "virtually all of its competition vastly outstrips it in power and features", including the  TI-99/4A.

In a review for Creative Computing, Joe Devlin wrote, "The permanent memory and powerful Basic exceed the capabilities found in most hand-held computers." He recommended it as a convenient tool for learning BASIC or for someone who frequently does calculations with formulas.

In 1983, MicroKids magazine included the CC-40 on a list of "Top 10 Great Gift Ideas."

Legacy

The Hex-Bus interface was also available for the TI-99/4A as an unreleased prototype expansion peripheral. It was built into the prototypes of the cancelled TI-99/2 and TI-99/8 computers.
 
An improved model, the CC-40 Plus, was in the final stages of development and included a cassette port. The project was canceled when Texas Instruments discontinued the 99/4A and exited the home computer market.  Most of the architecture of the CC-40 Plus was reused in the Texas Instruments TI-74.  The TI-74 changed the physical footprint of the Hexbus port and rename it Dockbus.  Old Hexbus peripherals could even be used on the TI-74 with an adapter.  

Also in development was the Compact Computer 70 (codenamed "Superstar"). The CC-70 was to have four cartridge ports, more RAM, and an 8 x 80 display with graphics capability. The CC-70 mock-up from Calculator division lead CB Wilson showed up on eBay in 2020.  Engineer Steven Reid has stated that the first run of chips for the CC-70 failed, and TI discontinued the Home Computer division in October 1983 before the chip issues could be corrected.

References 

 Thomas, David (1983).  Learn BASIC: A Guide to Programming the Texas Instruments Compact Computer 40.  Texas Instruments, Inc. and McGraw Hill, Inc. .

External links

 CC-40 images and documentaiton
 99er page on the CC-40
 OLD-COMPUTERS.COM online-museum CC-40 page
 Curtis McCain Page on the CC-40

Computer-related introductions in 1983
Home computers
Portable computers